Cazombo Airport  is an airport serving the city of Cazombo in the Moxico Province of Angola.

The Cazombo non-directional beacon (Ident: CZ) is on the field.

See also

 List of airports in Angola
 Transport in Angola

References

External links
 
 OpenStreetMap - Cazombo
 OurAirports - Cazombo

Airports in Angola
Moxico Province